The 2001–02 Mid-American Conference men's basketball season began with practices in October 2001, followed by the start of the 2001–02 NCAA Division I men's basketball season in November. Conference play began in January 2002 and concluded in March 2002. Ball State was the runner-up in the 2001 Maui Invitational Tournament.  They opened their season by beating #4 Kansas and #3 UCLA before losing to #1 Duke in the final.

Kent State won the regular season title with a conference record of 17–1 by five games over second-place Ball State and Bowling Green. Kent State defeated Bowling Green in the MAC tournament final and represented the MAC in the NCAA tournament. There they defeated Oklahoma State, Alabama, and Pittsburgh before losing to then eventual national runner-up Indiana Hoosiers in the Elite Eight.

Preseason awards
The preseason poll was announced by the league office on October 25, 2001.

Preseason men's basketball poll
(First place votes in parenthesis)

East Division
 Kent State (31) 313
  (7) 261
 Ohio (5) 231
  (6) 218
 
  107
  52

West Division
  (30) 270
  (17) 248
  (2) 210
  126
  103
 Eastern Michigan 74

Honors

Postseason

Mid–American Tournament

NCAA tournament

Postseason awards

Coach of the Year: Stan Heath, Kent State
Player of the Year: Keith McLeod, Bowling Green
Freshman of the Year: Ben Reed, Western Michigan
Defensive Player of the Year: Demetric Shaw, Kent State

Honors

References